Ingrandes-de-Touraine (literally Ingrandes of Touraine) is a former commune in the Indre-et-Loire department in central France. On 1 January 2017, it was merged into the new commune Coteaux-sur-Loire.

Population

See also
Communes of the Indre-et-Loire department

References

Former communes of Indre-et-Loire